American Princess is an American  reality competition that aired on WE tv from August 7, 2005, until October 7, 2007. It is hosted by Catherine Oxenberg with Jean Broke-Smith and Paul Burrell serving as judges. American Princess is based on the  George Bernard Shaw play Pygmalion and Alan Jay Lerner's My Fair Lady in a modern setting, where twenty American women who are average, plain, and rather ill-mannered, are taken to London, England to master the finer arts of British society and be crowned "American Princess" and earn valuable prizes. But first, the women have to learn how to eat dinner, handle cutlery, serve tea, walk in high heels, dance, and act as a proper royal should be.

There is an Australian version called Australian Princess, which features similar judges such as Paul Burell who also appears in both versions.

References

External links
Official Website (via Internet Archive)

2000s American reality television series
2005 American television series debuts
2007 American television series endings
Fashion-themed reality television series
Television series by ITV Studios